2-Pentanone or methyl propyl ketone (MPK) is a ketone and solvent of minor importance. It is comparable to methyl ethyl ketone, but has a lower solvency and is more expensive. It occurs naturally in Nicotiana tabacum (Tobacco) and blue cheese as a metabolic product of Penicillium mold growth.

References 

Pentanones
Ketone solvents